Archibasis oscillans, long-banded bluetail, is a species of damselfly in family Coenagrionidae. It is found from India, Thailand, Laos, and Indonesia.

Description and habitat
It is slender and long damselfly with blue capped light blue eyes. Its thorax is black with azure blue antehumeral stripes followed by blue on lateral sides. Abdomen is black on dorsum and greenish yellow on the ventral half of the lateral sides up to segment 7. Remaining segments are azure blue with apical black rings. Female is similar to the male; though a bit robust and paler in colors. 
  
It breeds in lowland forest streams and rivers.

See also
 List of odonates of India
 List of odonata of Kerala

References 

 http://animaldiversity.org/accounts/Archibasis_oscillans/classification/

External links

Coenagrionidae
Insects of India
Insects of Indonesia
Insects of Thailand
Insects described in 1877